Namig Sarafruz oglu Islamzadeh (born 1974), is an Azerbaijani military officer, major general serving in the Azerbaijani Armed Forces. He serves as a garrison commander in the "N" military unit of the Azerbaijani Air Forces in Kurdamir District. Islamzadeh is a participant of the 2020 Nagorno-Karabakh war.

Early years 
Namig Sarafruz oglu Islamzadeh was born on 7 May 1974, in Hovsan, Suraxanı District of Baku, capital of the then Azerbaijani SSR, Soviet Union.

Military service 

Islamzadeh is currently serving in the Azerbaijani Air Forces, belonging to the Azerbaijani Armed Forces. He has contributed to the modernization of Azerbaijan's air forces throughout his service years. He is graduated from Turkish Air Force Academy in 1996.

Islamzadeh, by 2005, was a major, and by 2008, a lieutenant colonel. By 2016, Islamzadeh, as a colonel, was serving as a garrison commander in the "N" military unit of the Azerbaijani Air Forces in Kurdamir District.

Islamzadeh took part in the 2020 Nagorno-Karabakh war. On 10 December 2020, a victory parade was held in Baku on the occasion of Azerbaijan's victory in the war. During the parade, a group of Sukhoi Su-25 aircraft flew over the city, led by Namig Islamzadeh, to show the colors of the Azerbaijani flag.

Awards 
 Islamzadeh was awarded the For military services medal on 24 June 2005 by the decree of the President of Azerbaijan, Ilham Aliyev.
 Islamzadeh was awarded the Azerbaijani Flag Order on 25 June 2008 by the decree of the President Aliyev.
 Islamzadeh was awarded the For Fatherland Order on 25 June 2020 by the decree of President Aliyev.
 Islamzadeh was awarded the rank of major general on 7 December 2020, which is the highest military rank in the Azerbaijani Armed Forces, by the decree of President Ilham Aliyev.
 Islamzadeh was awarded the title of the Hero of the Patriotic War on 9 December 2020, which is the highest honorary title in Azerbaijan, by the decree of the President Ilham Aliyev.

References 

Azerbaijani generals
Living people
1974 births
Heroes of the Patriotic War